Jan Versteegh (born 31 December 1985) is a Dutch television presenter and singer.

Career 

He is known for presenting various television programs which include PowNews, Spuiten en Slikken and Proefkonijnen. He also presented 6 Inside and as of 2019 the shows Lingo and Echt Waar?!.

He also participated as contestant in the game shows Expeditie Robinson 2013, De Slimste Mens (in 2014), It Takes 2 (in 2016), Weet Ik Veel (in 2016) and The Big Music Quiz (in 2017).

In 2018, he played the role of the mole in the 18th season of the popular television show Wie is de Mol?.

In 2022, he appears in the film Hart op de juiste plek. He also appears in the film De Grote Sinterklaasfilm: Gespuis in de Speelgoedkluis.

Filmography

As contestant 

 Expeditie Robinson 2013 (2013)
 De Slimste Mens (2014)
 It Takes 2 (2016)
 Weet Ik Veel (2016)
 The Big Music Quiz (2017)
 Britt's Beestenbende (2020)

As actor 

 Hart op de juiste plek (2022)
 De Grote Sinterklaasfilm: Gespuis in de Speelgoedkluis (2022)

References

External links 

 

1985 births
Living people
Dutch television presenters
Dutch male singers
21st-century Dutch people